Pompiliu is a Romanian masculine given name that may refer to:

Pompiliu Constantinescu
Pompiliu Eliade
Pompiliu Stoica
Pompiliu Ștefu

Romanian masculine given names